Patti Komline (born 1961) is a Republican politician who was elected and currently serves in the Vermont House of Representatives. She represents the Bennington-Rutland-1 Representative District. She was the House Minority Leader until 2011 when she was succeeded by Donald Turner.

Komline supported Libertarian nominee Gary Johnson in the 2016 presidential election over fellow Republican Donald Trump.

References

1961 births
Living people
Republican Party members of the Vermont House of Representatives
Women state legislators in Vermont
21st-century American politicians
21st-century American women politicians